Stenhouse may refer to:

Places

Australia 
 Stenhouse Bay, South Australia, a township in South Australia

Hong Kong 
 Mount Stenhouse on Lamma Island, Hong Kong

Scotland 
 Stenhouse, Edinburgh, a community in the City of Edinburgh

South Georgia and the South Sandwich Islands 
 Stenhouse Peak, a peak on South Georgia island

People
Alex Stenhouse (1910–1992), New Zealand footballer
Andrew G. Stenhouse (1869–1950) Scottish businessman, geologist, and astronomer
Anthony Maitland Stenhouse (1849–1927), Scottish-born Canadian politician 
Bart Stenhouse (born 1981), Australian jazz fusion musician and teacher
Bobby Stenhouse (1924–1990), British lawn and indoor bowls competitor
Dave Stenhouse (born 1933), American baseball player; father of Mike Stenhouse
David Stenhouse (born 1932), British evolutionary biologist and ethologist
Fanny Stenhouse (1829–1904), Jersey-born American pioneer and Mormon, later LDS opponent and writer; wife of T. B. H. Stenhouse
Gavin Stenhouse (born 1986), Hong Kong-born British actor
Jack Stenhouse (1911–1987), Australian footballer
Harry Stenhouse (1882–?), British footballer
Janita Stenhouse (born 1947), British yoga instructor and author
Jimmy Stenhouse (1919–?), Scottish footballer
John Stenhouse (1809–1880), Scottish chemist
John Stenhouse Goldie-Taubman (1838–1898), Manx politician and Speaker of the House of Keys
Joseph Stenhouse (1887–1941), Scottish-born Antarctic navigator
Lawrence Stenhouse (1926–1982), British educational theorist
Mike Stenhouse (born 1958), American baseball player; son of Dave Stenhouse
Nicol Stenhouse (1806–1873), Scottish-born Australian lawyer, writer, and literary patron
Patti Stenhouse (born 1955), Canadian swimmer
Paul Stenhouse (1935–2019), Canadian Catholic priest and editor
Richard Stenhouse (born 1966), British sailor and Olympics competitor
Ricky Stenhouse Jr. (born 1987), American stock car racing driver
T. B. H. Stenhouse (1825–1882), Scottish-born American pioneer, Mormon missionary, and later Godbeite and LDS opponent; husband of Fanny Stenhouse

See also

 Stenhouse Publishers

Stonhouse (disambiguation)
House (disambiguation)
Sten (disambiguation)

Scottish surnames
Surnames of Lowland Scottish origin